Nan Dunbar (18 July 1928 – 3 April 2005) was Fellow and Tutor in Classics at Somerville College, Oxford. She is known for her 1995 edition of Aristophanes' The Birds.

Early life and education 
Dunbar was born in Glasgow in 1928, where she attended Hutcheson's Girls School. She was the first in her family to attend university, graduating from the University of Glasgow with a first class honours degree and numerous awards including 'Most Distinguished Arts Graduate' in 1950. She then went on to study at Girton College, Cambridge, where she completed a second degree, achieving a first in both part of the Classical tripos.

Career 
Dunbar was appointed to a lectureship at the University of Edinburgh in 1952. Subsequently, she returned to Girton College, Cambridge, where she was a fellow and lecturer in Classics from 1952 to 1957. In 1957 she moved to the University of St Andrews, and in 1965 became a fellow of Somerville College, Oxford.

At Somerville, she was heavily involved with the running of the college, acting as the tutor for admissions and the steward of the college chapel, serving on the finance committee, and holding the office of Vice-Principal from 1983 until 1985. A portrait of her, bequeathed by her husband, is in the Somerville College Library. Somerville College also planted a Himalayan birch in its gardens in honour of Dunbar.

Edition of Aristophanes' Birds 
Dunbar took almost forty years to produce her "colossal" edition of Aristophanes' Birds with an introduction and commentary. It was finally published in 1995 to great acclaim. Her commentary is notable for its detailed discussion of the ornithological aspects of the play, reflecting detailed knowledge of modern ornithology.

An abridged edition for students was published by Oxford University Press in 1997.

Selected publications 

 1970. 'Three Notes on Aristophanes.' The Classical Review, 20(3), 269-273. doi:10.1017/S0009840X00227030 
 1990. The ornithology of Aristophanes' Bird-Wall: Birds 1136-1157. in ed. E. M. Craik 'Owls to Athens: essays on classical subjects presented to Sir Kenneth Dover.' 
 1995. (ed.), Aristophanes: Birds. Oxford: Clarendon Press,

References 

1928 births
2005 deaths
Alumni of the University of Glasgow
Alumni of Girton College, Cambridge
Fellows of Somerville College, Oxford
Women classical scholars
British classical scholars
People educated at Hutchesons' Grammar School